The Basilica of Sant'Eufemia is a minor basilica in Grado, Friuli-Venezia Giulia, Italy, formerly a cathedral. It is dedicated to Saint Euphemia.

History

The present basilica stands on a fourth century basilica, of which not much is known. Although some features are still visible. It was ordered built by Elijah, Archbishop of Aquileia, some time in the sixth century, during his retreat from the invasion of the Lombards. After, Elijah proclaimed himself patriarch and dedicated the church to Saint Euphemia.

During the sixth through early seventh century the basilica was the seat of the pro-Roman and pro-Byzantine branch of the church until the formation of the patriarchate of Grado.

Due to the suppression of the Grado patriarchate by the Venetians it lost the title of cathedral in 1451, but shortly after in 1455 the bell tower was built, possibly to compensate for this.

Alterations to the church were made in the seventeenth and nineteenth centuries, although these were partly removed in twentieth century restorations.

Features

Much of the fame of the basilica comes from the incredibly well preserved sixth century floor mosaics that decorate the basilica, as it is extremely rare to find the original floor mosaics preserved in an early Christian basilica.

Features from the fourth century basilica are visible in the nave, including a visible fragment of its floor mosaics and a Corinthian capital.

The bell tower is topped with a cast copper weathervane statue of Archangel Michael, which has become a symbol of the city.

The apse is decorated with a thirteenth century Gothic fresco of Christ enthroned.

On the left side of the central nave stands a tall hexagonal pulpit, which is adorned with thirteenth century sculptured decorations.

Next to the basilica complex is an octagonal baptistery which is also adorned with sixth century floor mosaics and contains a large marble dipping basin.

Gallery

References

Links
Profile; retrieved 24 February  2016.

Sources
 Rentetzi, Efthalia, 2008: Un'inedita figura di pesce. Parentele stilistiche tra i mosaici pavimentali di s. Maria delle Grazie e s. Eufemia a Grado, in Artonweb - Arte - Efthalia Rentetzi: un’inedita figura di pesce

Bibliography
 Bisconti, F., 2000: Temi di Iconografia Paleocristiana. Città del Vaticano
 Bovini, G., 1973: Grado Paleocristiana in Archeologia Cristiana. Bologna
 Farioli, R., 1975: Mosaici Pavimentali dell'alto Adriatico e dell'Africa settentrionale in età bizantina, in Antichità Altoadriatiche, vol. V. (paleocristiana). Ravenna
 Farioli, R., 1975: Pavimenti musivi di Ravenna. Ravenna
 Rentetzi, Efthalia, 2009: Un frammento inedito di S. Eufemia a Grado. Il pavimento musivo del Salutatorium, in Arte Cristiana, n. 850 (January–February) 2009, Vol. XCVII, pp. 51–52
 Trovabene, Giordana, nd: Il salutatorium del vescovo Elia nella cattedrale di Grado : nuove considerazioni sul mosaico pavimentale, in Atti del XV colloquio dell'Associazione Italiana per lo Studio e la Conservazione del Mosaico, pp. 41–52
 Guida rossa: Friuli-Venezia Giulia. Milano: Touring Club editore, 1999, pp. 505–508. 

Former cathedrals in Italy
Churches in the province of Gorizia
Basilica churches in Friuli-Venezia Giulia
Minor basilicas in Friuli-Venezia Giulia